Azem, ti je gjallë is a 2008 documentary film about the Albanian political leader Azem Hajdari, directed by Saimir Kumbaro.

Azem Hajdari
Azem Hajdari (March 11, 1963 - September 12, 1998), was the leader of the student's movement in 1990-1991 which overthrew communism in Albania and then an Albanian politician of the Democratic Party. He was assassinated in Tirana.

References

Documentary films about politics
Albanian documentary films